is a 2005 Japanese horror film, directed by Takashi Shimizu. It centers on a hopeful actress who won a role in a film that takes her, the cast, and the crew to a hotel where the present soon collides with the past.

It was released as a part of the six-volume J-Horror Theater.

Plot
A number of people see visions of apparently dead people: a businessman finds one behind him in an elevator and a truck driver runs over one on the road.

Professor Norihasa Omori visits a local hotel and films himself killing eleven of the hotel guests, employees, and his own children before committing suicide, all as part of his wish to understand reincarnation. The footage of the murders disappears. Thirty-five years later, horror movie director Ikuo Matsumura decides to make a film about the massacre. As the date of the shoot draws near, Nagisa Sugiura, the actress set to star as Omori's daughter Chisato, is haunted by the ghosts of the victims. She begins hallucinating and is plagued by nightmares of the killings. She discovers an old film camera which is the same type the professor had used.

Yayoi Kinoshita, a college student, meets Yuka Morita, an actress who had auditioned for Ikuo's movie. Yuka says she remembers things in a "past life" and shows Yayoi a birthmark that looks like evidence of strangulation. Ghosts later drag Yuka away. Yayoi's research takes her to the only survivor of the attack: Ayumi Omori, the professor's wife. She explains that he had become obsessed with the idea that the body is just a vessel.

During filming, Nagisa starts hallucinating. Nagisa's agent reviews the camera, which consists of the film the professor took as he committed the murders. As this film plays, Nagisa reenacts the events in her hallucination. She witnesses the actors, including Yayoi and the director, and the two men in the start of the movie, all transform into the people they portray. With the victims walking toward her, she escapes and runs into the town. Simultaneously, her agent watches the film of this escape from the professor's POV. Nagisa finds herself cornered in a store and grabs a piece of glass to kill herself. She looks at her reflection and sees the face of the professor. Her agent watches the professor in his film reveal Nagisa's reflection instead of his own in the glass, before he cuts his own throat. Nagisa starts to reenact the professor's suicide but the doll stops her to tell her they will be together forever.

A group of executives watch Nagisa's take. Among them is the professor's wife. Near the end, Nagisa collapses, shaking and screaming as crew members come to her aid. By the professor's wife are her two children and the wife smiles. Sometime later, in a mental ward, Nagisa is bound in a full-body wrap and still haunted by the souls of Omori's children. The professor's wife looks at her through the door window, then passes her children's favourite toys through to Nagisa: a red ball and the doll. Nagisa screams but eventually calms down with a sinister smile as the ghosts of the children close in on her.

Cast

Release
The film was released as part of producer Takashige Ichise's J-Horror Theater series along with Infection, Premonition, and Retribution, among others.

Reincarnation premiered at the 18th Tokyo International Film Festival in October 2005. Reincarnation was distributed theatrically by Toho on January 7, 2006. The film was released by Lions Gate Films on November 18, 2006 in the United States.

It was theatrically released in the United States as one of the eight films in the nationwide film festival After Dark Horrorfest, which ran November 17 through 21, 2006.

See also
 List of ghost films

Notes

References

External links
 
 

2005 films
2005 horror films
2005 psychological thriller films
Films directed by Takashi Shimizu
Japanese horror films
Japanese supernatural horror films
Films about actors
Films about reincarnation
J-Horror Theater
Films about murder
Japanese ghost films
Films set in hotels
Japanese psychological horror films
Films scored by Kenji Kawai
2000s Japanese films